Al Nile is an Arabic-language television news channel. Launched on October 6, 1998, the channel is based in Cairo, Egypt, and is partly owned by the Egyptian television.

References

External links

1998 establishments in Egypt
Arab mass media
Arabic-language television stations
24-hour television news channels
Television stations in Egypt
Television channels and stations established in 1998
Arabic-language television
Mass media in Cairo